Martin Weber (born 24 October 1957) is a retired Swiss football defender and later manager.

Honours
Swiss Super League:
Winner: 1985–86
Swiss Super Cup:
Winner: 1986
Swiss Cup:
Winner: 1986–87

References

1957 births
Living people
Swiss men's footballers
FC Biel-Bienne players
BSC Young Boys players
Association football defenders
Swiss Super League players
Switzerland under-21 international footballers
Switzerland international footballers
Swiss football managers
FC Solothurn managers
BSC Young Boys managers